Edward S. Siskind (May 5, 1886 – July 20, 1955) was an American football and basketball coach.  He served as the head football coach at Fordham University in 1918, compiling a record of 4–2–1.  Siskind was also the head basketball coach at Fordham in 1909–10 and 1918–19, tallying a mark of 40–7 in two seasons.

Head coaching record

Football

References

1886 births
1955 deaths
American football ends
Fordham Rams football coaches
Fordham Rams football players
Fordham Rams men's basketball coaches
Jewish American sportspeople